Dry Falls, also known as Upper Cullasaja Falls, is a 65-foot (20.1 m) waterfall located in the Nantahala National Forest, northwest of Highlands, North Carolina.

Geology
Dry Falls flows on the Cullasaja River through the Nantahala National Forest.  It is part of a series of waterfalls on an 8.7-mile (14 km) stretch of the river that eventually ends with Cullasaja Falls.  Dry Falls flows over an overhanging bluff that allows visitors to walk up under the falls and remain relatively dry when the waterflow is low, hence its name.  Visitors will get wet if the waterflow is high.

History
The falls has been called Dry Falls for a long time, but has also gone by a few other names, including High Falls, Pitcher Falls, and Cullasaja Falls. It received its name because supposedly, you can walk behind the falls and stay dry, however this is only true in periods of low flow.

Visiting The Falls
Dry Falls is located on the side of U.S. Highway 64 3.1 miles (5.0 km) north of Highlands, North Carolina.  There is a parking area on the side of the road, where visitors can park before walking the short path with stairs to the falls.

During 2008–2009 the Forest Service made improvements to the parking area, which included renovation and expansion and the addition of bathroom facilities. A new walkway and overlook were also constructed adjacent to the parking area.

See also
Quarry Falls
Cullasaja Falls
Bridal Veil Falls

References

External links 
North Carolina Waterfalls Bridal Veil and Dry Falls
Panoramic virtual tour from behind Dry Falls
Photos and videos of Highlands NC waterfalls: Dry Falls, Bridal Veil, Glen Falls, Cullasaja

Protected areas of Macon County, North Carolina
Waterfalls of North Carolina
Nantahala National Forest
Waterfalls of Macon County, North Carolina